The Changing Lights is a 2013 album by Stacey Kent.

Track listing 

 "This Happy Madness" (Antônio Carlos Jobim, Vinicius de Moraes, Gene Lees) - 5:37
 "The Summer We Crossed Europe In The Rain" (Kazuo Ishiguro, Jim Tomlinson) - 5:31
 "One Note Samba" (Antônio Carlos Jobim, Newton Mendonça) - 3:02
 "Mais Uma Vez" (António Ladeira, Jim Tomlinson) - 5:54
 "Waiter, Oh Waiter" (Kazuo Ishiguro, Jim Tomlinson) - 5:08
 "O Barquinho" (Ronaldo Bôscoli, Roberto Menescal) - 3:06
 "The Changing Lights" (Kazuo Ishiguro, Jim Tomlinson) - 6:18 
 "How Insensitive" (Antônio Carlos Jobim, Vinicius de Moraes, Norman Gimbel) - 4:03
 "O Bêbado E A Equilibrista / Smile" (Aldir Blanc, João Bosco / Charles Chaplin, Geoffrey Parsons, John Turner - 4:24
 "Like A Lover" (Nelson Motta, Dori Caymmi, Alan and Marilyn Bergman) - 3:37 
 "The Face I Love" (Marcos Valle, Paulo Sérgio Valle), Carlos Pingarilho, Ray Gilbert) - 4:07
 "A Tarde" (António Ladeira, Jim Tomlinson) - 2:52
 "Chanson Légère" (António Ladeira, Jim Tomlinson) - 4:04

Personnel 
Performance
Stacey Kent - vocals, guitar
 Jim Tomlinson - tenor sax, soprano sax & flute
 Graham Harvey - piano
 Roberto Menescal -guitar
 John Parricelli - guitar
 Jeremy Brown - guitar
 Matt Home - drums
 Joshua Morrison - drums
 Raymundo Bittencourt - ganzá

Recorded November 2012 and April 2013 at the Curtis Schwartz Studios, Ardingley, Sussex, UK

Charts

Weekly charts

Year-end charts

References

2013 albums
Portuguese-language albums
Stacey Kent albums